[
  {
    "type": "ExternalData",
    "service": "geoline",
    "ids": "Q18359019",
    "properties": {
      "title": "Johor Bahru–Singapore Rapid Transit System",
      "stroke": "#87CEFA",
      "stroke-width": 6
    }
  },
  {
    "type": "ExternalData",
    "service": "geoline",
    "ids": "Q759229",
    "properties": {
      "title": "North South MRT line",
      "stroke": "#dc241f",
      "stroke-opacity": 0.3,
      "stroke-width": 6
    }
  },
  {
    "type": "ExternalData",
    "service": "geoline",
    "ids": "Q7795883",
    "properties": {
      "title": "Thomson–East Coast MRT line",
      "stroke": "#734538",
      "stroke-opacity": 0.3,
      "stroke-width": 6
    }
  },
  {
    "type": "Feature",
    "geometry": { "type": "Point", "coordinates": [103.76071, 1.47154] },
    "properties": {
      "title": "Wadi Hana Depot",
      "description": "",
      "marker-symbol": "warehouse",
      "marker-size": "small",
      "marker-color": "87CEFA"
    }
  },
  {
    "type": "Feature",
    "geometry": { "type": "Point", "coordinates": [103.76219, 1.46646] },
    "properties": {
      "title": "Bukit Chagar RTS station",
      "description": "",
      "marker-symbol": "rail-metro",
      "marker-size": "small",
      "marker-color": "87CEFA"
    }
  },
  {
    "type": "Feature",
    "geometry": { "type": "Point", "coordinates": [103.78665, 1.44780] },
    "properties": {
      "title": "Woodlands North MRT station",
      "description": "",
      "marker-symbol": "rail-metro",
      "marker-size": "small",
      "marker-color": "87CEFA"
    }
  }
]

The Johor Bahru–Singapore Rapid Transit System (RTS Link) is an international cross-border rapid transit system that will connect Johor Bahru, Malaysia and Woodlands, Singapore, crossing the Strait of Johor. It will consist of two stations, with the Malaysian terminus at Bukit Chagar station and the Singaporean terminus at Woodlands North station, which also interchanges with Singapore's Thomson–East Coast MRT line. 

Both stations will consist of co-located customs, immigration and quarantine facilities of both countries. When built, the RTS Link will be the second rail link between the two countries after the KTM Intercity's Shuttle Tebrau, between JB Sentral and Woodlands Train Checkpoint. However, the RTS Link is expected to replace this shuttle once it is completed. 

A joint operating company between Singapore's SMRT Corporation and Malaysia's Prasarana will be the operator of the link. Construction started on the Malaysian section on 22 November 2020 and on the Singaporean section on 22 January 2021.

Background

Planning and development
The idea of a Mass Rapid Transit system between Northern Singapore and Johor Bahru was first suggested in 1991 when Singapore's communications minister Mah Bow Tan said that the Woodlands Extension, now part of the North South line, would be designed to accommodate such an extension. The idea was endorsed and agreed to in principle by both countries.

The rapid transit system was then revisited two decades later and proposed during the Singapore-Malaysia Leaders' Retreat on 24 May 2010. The RTS would link Tanjung Puteri, Johor Bahru and Woodlands, Singapore, aiming to ease traffic congestion on the Johor–Singapore Causeway and enhance connectivity between the two countries. It was targeted to be operational by 2018.

Concrete steps
In June 2011, Singapore proposed to Malaysia that the proposed cross border rail link be connected to the northernmost station of the Thomson-East Coast line, Woodlands North. A tender was called in November 2011 to conduct design and engineering study on the RTS link, which aimed to determine the technical parameters and options for the alignment and proposals for the system. A consortium of Aecom Perunding, Aecom Singapore and SA Architects subsequently won the tender. The first part of a preliminary engineering study was completed in March 2014.

In September 2014, the Johor Public Works, Rural and Regional Development Committee selected Bukit Chagar as its terminus after a public vote, over Tanjung Puteri, JB Sentral 1 and JB Sentral 2. It also confirmed that the terminus would have operate its own customs and immigration clearance facilities, separate from the existing facilities at Sultan Iskandar Building. Its chairman Hasni Mohammad stated that Singapore had given no indication of the final alignment of the link from a total of three options. This drew a response from Singapore's Ministry of Transport which replied that they were unable to finalise the alignment of the crossing as there was no confirmation of the location of Malaysia's terminus.

On 13 December 2016, the countries' prime ministers confirmed a high-bridge crossing for the RTS to cross the Strait of Johor. The link would be operated by a corporate entity and fares market-based and set by the operator. The following year, in July 2017, it was stated that the line would begin operations on 31 December 2024 and that a jointly run-operating company would run and maintain the RTS operating systems, including its trains, tracks and signalling system. Each government would also appoint an infrastructure company to fund, build, own, maintain and upgrade the civil infrastructure and stations in their own countries. Daily shuttle train service from Woodlands Train Checkpoint to Johor Bahru would also cease operating after the RTS Link opens.

In August 2017, the Sultan of Johor Ibrahim Ismail expressed serious reservations on the proposed design of the rail track, citing that the overall curve-shaped design and height would disrupt the city skyline along the Johor Straits. He also questioned the need for both countries to engage separate contractors to build portions of the link in their respective countries and the involvement of Prasarana Malaysia in the joint operating company with SMRT Corporation instead of the Johor state government. As such, he wanted the overall plan to be reviewed to ensure that it would be "logical, economical and sustainable".

A memorandum of understanding between SMRT Corporation and Prasarana Malaysia was signed in September 2017 to form a joint venture company to operate the link. Details such as control of the operating company were yet to be worked out. On 16 January 2018, Singapore and Malaysia signed a bilateral agreement on the project finalizing certain aspects of the project, including its maintenance facilities, operator, and customs facilities.

Delay and suspension by Malaysia
Following the 2018 Malaysian general election which resulted in a change of government, Malaysia's transport minister Loke Siew Fook mentioned in May 2018 that it sought to reduce the cost of the project amidst efforts to reduce the Malaysian national debt. However, in mid-July 2018, Singapore's transport minister Khaw Boon Wan said in Parliament that it had not received any official communication from the new Malaysian government despite Loke's comments. A joint operating company between Singapore's SMRT Corporation and Malaysia's Prasarana Malaysia that was supposed to be incorporated by 30 June 2018 failed to materialize as discussions were suspended.

In July 2018, Malaysia's Loke expressed hope for the project's continuation and that the Malaysian cabinet had given in-principle approval to the project but was still looking into the cost and other details. He also mentioned that the issue of compensation did not apply as the joint operating company was not set up yet. A working paper on the project was to be presented to the cabinet the joint operating company set up upon its approval. Despite the delay, he said that the project would still be completed on time by 2024.

On 14 January 2019, Singapore's Khaw confirmed that the project was not progressing well, with Malaysia missing deadlines that were set in the bilateral meeting in 2018. Deadlines were extended as soon as they were negotiable – the first until September 2018, then December 2018, then February 2019. On 8 April 2019, the two transport ministers stated that both sides were working towards a "supplemental agreement" to temporarily suspend the project for 6 months, allowing Malaysia to review "key parameters" of the project. The suspension would be approached in the same way as was done for the suspension of the Kuala Lumpur–Singapore high speed rail. On 21 May, the project was suspended for six months until 30 September, with Malaysia compensating Singapore more than $600,000 of abortive costs incurred. On 28 September, Malaysia further extended the suspension to 31 October, which Singapore acceded to without claiming compensation, but reserving its right to do so after the date.

On 11 October 2019, Malaysia announced in its budget that it would proceed with the project with Singapore, although with significant financial cuts. On 31 October, Malaysian prime minister Mahathir Mohamad announced a 36 percent cost cut from the original RM4.93 billion to RM3.16 billion. Some of the proposals included involving the developers/owners of the Bukit Chagar land to waive land costs and using a light rail system similar to the Ampang LRT line instead of the heavy rail Thomson–East Coast MRT line system to reduce costs. In the aftermath of the 2020 Malaysian political crisis, a second change of government resulted in Muhyiddin Yassin becoming prime minister in March 2020. On 2 May, due to the COVID-19 pandemic, it was agreed to suspend the project further until 31 July 2020. Discussions with the new government continued ahead of a final deadline on 31 July.

Resumption 
On 21 July 2020, Malaysia's transport minister Wee Ka Siong stated that construction was due to begin in January 2021 with targeted completion in 2026. The planned depot in Mandai would also be relocated to Johor Bahru, with construction cost borne by Malaysia. On 30 July 2020, Singapore prime minister Lee Hsien Loong and Malaysia prime minister Muhyiddin Yassin attended the ceremony at the midway point of the Causeway that marked the resumption of the RTS project. As of May 2022, the RTS is planned to begin operations by 2026.

Construction

Bukit Chagar station
Works on Bukit Chagar station began on 22 November, coinciding with the birthday of Johor Sultan Ibrahim Iskandar. The station will be owned and developed by MRT Corp.

Woodlands North station
On 26 November 2020, the construction contract of Woodlands North RTS station in Singapore was awarded to Penta-Ocean Construction Co Ltd valued at S$932.8 million (US$675.94 million) by the Land Transport Authority (LTA). The contract also includes the construction of the tunnels and the Customs, Immigration, and Quarantine (CIQ) building. Its construction began on 22 January 2021 in a groundbreaking ceremony attended by Minister for Transport Ong Ye Kung. The second contract to construct tunnels and viaducts was awarded on 29 January 2021 by LTA to China Communications Construction Company Limited (Singapore branch) at a value of S$180 million (US$135.24 million).

Marine viaduct
On 13 October 2018, it was reported that Singapore's Land Transport Authority has called for tender for the construction of a 1.1 km tunnel and overhead bridge to Johor in end-September 2018. Construction is scheduled to begin in the middle of 2019.

Infrastructure and operations

Route and services
The RTS will run in a north-south direction connecting Bukit Chagar station on the Malaysian side and Woodlands North station on the Singaporean side. Passenger operation is expected to commence by January 2027 and is projected to reduce traffic on the Causeway by at least 35%, with an estimated 10,000 passengers per hour in each direction. Malaysia's MRT Corp aims to meet the goal of five minutes to clear immigration, five minutes of waiting and travel time between the two stations, and five minutes to exit the other station.

Rolling stock

Initially, it was announced in December 2016 that the line would adopt the heavy rail Thomson–East Coast MRT line's system, which includes sharing the trains, signalling system, communication system and Integrated Supervisory Control System. This was to reap economies of scale. However, in an effort to cut costs on the project, it was decided to adopt a light rail system similar to the Shah Alam Line for this project. The trains will run in a four-car formation with a passenger capacity of 1069. The light rail trains would be maintained in a new depot at Wadi Hana.

Immigration facilities
Each terminus will have co-located immigration facilities – commuters will clear both Singapore and Malaysia authorities at the departure point and not at the arrival point. This arrangement allows convenient passenger travel when crossing the border.

Stations

Legend

List

See also
 Thomson–East Coast MRT
 Iskandar Malaysia BRT
 Øresundsmetro – a similar cross-border metro line proposed between Denmark and Sweden
 Øresundståg

References

External links
 LTA official website (Singapore)
 MRT Corp official website (Malaysia)
 RTS Link PIC Virtual Tour

Proposed public transport in Singapore
Proposed rail infrastructure in Malaysia
Cross-border rapid transit
Transport in Johor Bahru
Transport in Singapore
2027 in rail transport